The European Union (Future Relationship) Act 2020 (c. 29) is an Act of the Parliament of the United Kingdom that implements the EU–UK Trade and Cooperation Agreement agreed between the United Kingdom and the European Union and Euratom in December 2020. The bill for the Act was introduced to the House of Commons by Chancellor of the Duchy of Lancaster Michael Gove on 30 December 2020, with the aim of enacting the bill on the same day.

The trade agreement was provisionally applied immediately after the Brexit transition period ended on 31 December 2020, with the Act serving as the UK Parliament's ratification of the agreement. Before the agreement comes fully into force, the English version of the treaty needs to be legally checked and tidied up ("scrubbed"), and needs to be adopted by the European Parliament and the Council of the European Union.

The House of Commons was recalled from recess – the House of Lords was already sitting – to enable the legislation to be debated, and it was passed by 521 votes to 73.

Passage through Parliament

House of Commons

Business of the House Motion 
Leader of the House of Commons Jacob Rees-Mogg put forward a motion to fast-track the bill through the House of Commons on 30 December 2020. This was criticised by Labour's Valerie Vaz, calling the decision to have limited debate "unacceptable".

Patrick Grady (SNP) tabled an amendment to extend debate. It was put to a division where it was voted down by the Conservatives and Democratic Unionist Party with one Tory MP, William Wragg, rebelling. Labour abstained.

Approval 
Nearly all Conservative MPs and most Labour MPs voted in favour of the bill, while every other party in the Commons voted against. Tonia Antoniazzi and Helen Hayes resigned from their position on Labour's frontbench to abstain, with Bell Ribeiro-Addy being the only Labour MP to vote against the Bill:

House of Lords

Business of the House 
A similar amendment to extend the length of debate was put forward by Lord Adonis, which was voted down thus the Bill is to be completed in one day.

Approval 
The European Union (Future Relationship) Bill was approved by the House of Lords on 30 December 2020, allowing the bill to be given royal assent in the early hours of 31 December.

References 

Acts of the Parliament of the United Kingdom relating to the European Union
Brexit
EU–UK Trade and Cooperation Agreement
United Kingdom Acts of Parliament 2020